Michal Zeman (born 18 August 1984) is a Czech football defender currently playing for FK Ústí nad Labem.

External links 
 Profile at iDNES.cz
 Guardian Stats Centre

Czech footballers
Czech First League players
FC Slovan Liberec players
FK Ústí nad Labem players
Living people
1984 births
Association football defenders